Pope John XVII (died 6 November 1003), born John Sicco, was the bishop of Rome and nominal ruler of the Papal States for about seven months in 1003. He was one of the popes chosen and eclipsed by the patrician John Crescentius.

Family 

John Sicco was the son of another John Sicco, and was born in the region of Rome then referred to as Biveretica. Before entering the priesthood, Sicco had been married and had three sons who also entered holy orders: John, bishop of Praeneste; Peter, a deacon; and Andrew, a secundicerius.

Pontificate
John XVII succeeded Silvester II as pope on 16 May 1003. He was nominated to the papacy by John Crescentius, a Roman noble who held power in the city in opposition to Emperor Otto III. John XVII approved of a mission led by Bruno of Querfurt to Eastern Europe. Bruno also requested John XVII to authorize his companion Benedict to evangelize among the Slavs.

John died on 6 November 1003 and was buried in the Lateran Basilica between the two doors of the principal façade. According to John the Deacon, his epitaph began by stating that "here is the tomb of the supreme John, who is said to be pope, for so he was called." John XVII's successor, John XVIII, was also selected by Crescentius.

Footnotes

References
 
 

Attribution:

Literature 
 
 John N. D. Kelly: Reclams Lexikon der Päpste. 2nd edition, Reclam, Stuttgart, 2005 , sub voce.
 .

External links 

Popes
Italian popes
11th-century archbishops
1003 deaths
Year of birth unknown
11th-century popes
Married Roman Catholic bishops